North Carolina Highway 7 (NC 7) is a primary state highway in the U.S. state of North Carolina.  Entirely within Gaston County, it connects the towns of Lowell, McAdenville, and Belmont with the city of Gastonia.

Route description

Gastonia, Ranlo, and Lowell
NC 7's western terminus is at U.S. Route 321 (US 321), just north of downtown Gastonia. US 321 at this point is divided onto two roads: North Chester Street and North York Street. NC 7 is also known as Ozark Avenue in the city of Gastonia. Traveling in a northeasterly direction, NC 7 crosses Interstate 85 (I-85) for the first time and shortly after, intersects with NC 279. After crossing Spencer Mountain Road into the town of Ranlo, NC 7 becomes the aptly named Lowell Road since the next town NC 7 enters is Lowell. Once inside the Lowell town limits, NC 7 is also known as West First Street. In downtown Lowell, NC 7 turns left onto Main Street and quickly turns right onto Third Street, where NC 7 makes its second crossing of Interstate 85 (exit 23).

McAdenville and ChristmasTown USA
Immediately after crossing I-85, NC 7 enters one of North Carolina's most famous cities: McAdenville. Every Christmas season, McAdenville residents deck nearly every square foot of the town with decorations; the event is known as ChristmasTown USA. During this time, NC 7 can become a traffic nightmare as tourists flock to McAdenville. Through this segment, NC 7 is known as Main Street. Immediately after crossing the South Fork Catawba River and leaving downtown McAdenville, NC 7 makes another turn, onto Riverside Drive, which is renamed McAdenville Road a half-mile down the road.

Cramerton and Belmont
After skirting the outskirts of Cramerton, NC 7 once again changes road. This time NC 7 moves right onto Old NC 273 in Belmont; exit ramps to another interchange with Interstate 85 (exit 26) are found near this intersection. NC 7 crosses US 29/US 74 and then loops around downtown Belmont, before going back to US 29/74, where it ends. Through town, NC 7 is known as Main Street, and then as Catawba Street. NC 7 and NC 273 do intersect in the center of downtown Belmont. Three quarters of a mile after this intersection, NC 7 comes to its eastern terminus.

History
Established in 1932 as a renumbering of NC 29; which itself was created two years prior when US 74/NC 20 was realigned between Lowell, McAdenville, and Belmont.  In 1935, NC 7 was extended west, on new road, to Kings Mountain; however, in 1938, it was reverted to its original western terminus when US 29/US 74 was realigned onto the new road, dropping the route through Bessemer City.  The route has changed little since its inception.

North Carolina Highway 29

North Carolina Highway 29 (NC 29) was established 1930 when US 74/NC 20 was realigned onto new road; this was its second form.  In 1932, it was renumbered as NC 7.

The first NC 29 was an original state highway from the South Carolina state line, near Tuxedo, to English, located in Walnut Mountains.  In 1928, NC 29 was replaced by NC 69, between the South Carolina state line to Mars Hill; with NC 31 in Mars Hill and NC 311 north to the Tennessee state line.

Major intersections

Special routes

Belmont truck route

NC 7 Truck is a short  route that overlaps entirely with US 29 and US 74 through Belmont.  The truck route was established to keep trucks from traveling through downtown Belmont.  The eastern terminus is also the end point of NC 7.

References

External links

 NCRoads.com: N.C. 7
 NCRoads.com: N.C. 29

007
Transportation in Gaston County, North Carolina